Charles River Associates (legally CRA International, Inc.) is a global consulting firm headquartered in Boston.

Practice areas

Their practices include: aerospace & defense, antitrust & competition economics, auctions & competitive bidding, climate & sustainability, energy & environment, enterprise risk management, financial accounting & valuation, financial markets, financial economics, forensic services, insurance economics, intellectual property, labor & employment, life sciences, mergers & acquisitions, and transfer pricing.

History 

CRA acquired economic consultancy firm Lexecon in 2005 to expand its practice into Europe and the United Kingdom.

Marakon, which CRA acquired in 2009, forms part of their management consulting practice. Marakon Associates was founded in 1978 and pioneered value-based management (VBM) from the mid 1980s based on the academic work of Dr. Bill Alberts. This management principle, also known as managing for value (MFV), states that management should first and foremost consider the interests of shareholders when making management decisions. Under this principle, senior executives should set performance targets in terms of delivering shareholder returns (stock price and dividends payments) and managing to achieve them.

Economic forecasts used to oppose climate policymaking 
Prior to the 1992 Earth Summit in Rio de Janeiro and the 1997 Kyoto summit (that led to the Kyoto Protocol), the fossil fuel industry used reports authored by CRA and funded by the fossil fuel industry to argue that US compliance with climate policy would be economically disastrous. CRA called the Clinton administration's projections for costs of compliance with the Kyoto Protocol wildly optimistic, and argued that compliance would take a "healthy whack out of the economy". CRA's work forecasting the impact on employment of the 2003 Climate Stewardship Act was criticized by the Natural Resources Defense Council in 2005 for using unrealistic economic assumptions and producing directionally incorrect estimates. According to a 2021 study, flawed economic forecasting reports written by four economists at Charles River Associates between 1991 and 2009, and paid for by fossil fuel interests, overestimated predicted costs and ignored potential policy benefits. The study argues that the reports written by CRA "played a key role in weakening, delaying, or defeating a wide range of climate policies".

See also

 Analysis Group
 Bates White
 Berkeley Research Group
 Brattle Group
 Compass Lexecon
 Cornerstone Research
 Frontier Economics
 NERA Economic Consulting

References

Further reading

External links

 

 CRA International at OpenCorporates

Macroeconomics consulting firms
International management consulting firms
Management consulting firms of Canada
Management consulting firms of the United States
Companies based in Massachusetts
Companies listed on the Nasdaq